Adrián Hernández (born January 10, 1986) is a Mexican former professional boxer who competed from 2006 to 2015. He is a two-time world champion, having held the WBC light flyweight title twice between 2011 and 2014.

Professional career
On February 9, 2008, Hernández knocked out Rodel Mayol. In March 2008, Hernández knocked out former WBC Light Flyweight Champion Gilberto Keb Baas. On May 8, 2010 Hernández beat the veteran Jose Guadalupe Martinez, to win NABF Light Flyweight Championship.

Winning the WBC Light Flyweight Championship
Hernández defeated the WBC Light Flyweight Champion Gilberto Keb Baas by doctor stoppage after the 10th of 12 rounds on April 30, 2011, to win the title. He then defeated Gideon Buthelezi by second-round knockout on September 24, 2011, to retain the title. The IBO Light Flyweight title was originally scheduled to be on the line, but Hernández did not win the title because he did not pay IBO sanctioning fees, so as a result of his win, the IBO title became vacant.

Losing and Regaining the WBC Light Flyweight Championship
Hernández would then lose the WBC Light Flyweight Championship to Kompayak Porpramook by 10th-round knockout on December 23, 2011, in Bangkok, Thailand.

He would rebound with wins over Oswaldo Fuentes and Ivan Diaz via first-round knockout on June 17, 2012, and unanimous decision on July 27, 2012, respectively. A rematch with Porpramook was then confirmed for October 6, 2012, where Hernández avenged his loss to Porpramook and regained the WBC Light Flyweight Championship via a sixth-round TKO in Toluca, Mexico.

Hernández would then successfully defend the title against Dirceu Cabarca on January 12, 2013, and against Yader Cardoza on May 11, 2013, both wins coming by unanimous decision.

His third and fourth successful defenses in his second reign as WBC Light Flyweight champion came against Atsushi Kakutani via fourth-round knockout on August 31, 2013, and Janiel Rivera via third-round technical knockout on February 8, 2014.

Hernández would lose the title to Naoya Inoue on April 6, 2014, via sixth-round technical knockout. He reportedly struggled badly to make weight before the fight, even resorting to shaving his head in order to meet the light flyweight limit.

Professional boxing record

See also
List of Mexican boxing world champions
List of WBC world champions

References

External links
 

Boxers from the State of Mexico
World Boxing Council champions
World light-flyweight boxing champions
World boxing champions
Light-flyweight boxers
1986 births
Living people
People from Toluca
Mexican male boxers